Justin Arboleda (born 18 September 1991) is a Colombian professional footballer who plays as a forward for Olimpia in the Liga Nacional de Fútbol de Honduras. He scored two goals in the 2020 CONCACAF Champions League to help Olimpia reach the semifinal of that tournament.

Honours

Club
C.D. Marathón
Liga Profesional de Honduras: 2017–18 C
Honduran Cup: 2017
Honduran Supercup: 2019

References

External links 

1991 births
Colombian footballers
Liga Nacional de Fútbol Profesional de Honduras players
Living people
Association football forwards
Independiente Medellín footballers
Zamora FC players
Unión Deportivo Universitario players
Deportivo Pasto footballers
C.D. Marathón players
C.D. Olimpia players